The following is a list of bell ringing organizations

List of change ringing organizations
Below is a list of all currently known ringing societies around the world. This includes societies affiliated to the Central Council of Church Bell Ringers – identified by the number of representative members.:

 Aberystwyth University Society
 Aldenham College Youths
 Ancient Society of College Youths (4 CC Reps)
 Antient Free and Accepted Masons of England - Clavis Lodge No. 8585
 Army Guild of Bellringers
The Australian and New Zealand Association of Bellringers (4 CC Reps)
 Bangor Student Society
 Barnsley and District Society
 Barrow and District Society (1 CC Rep)
 Bath and Wells Diocesan Association (5 CC Reps)
 Bath University Society
 Bedfordshire Association (3 CC Reps)
 Beverley and District Society (2 CC Reps)
 Birmingham University Society
 Cambridge University Guild (2 CC Reps)
 Camping, Caravanning and Hostelling Ringing Society
 Canterbury Colleges Society
 Cardiff Students' Society
 Carlisle Diocesan Guild (2 CC Reps)
 Central European Association
 Chester Diocesan Guild (4 CC Reps)
 Clerical Ringers Guild
Company of Ringers of the Blessed Virgin Mary of Lincoln
 Coventry Diocesan Guild (4 CC Reps)
 Derby Diocesan Association (4 CC Reps)
 Devon Association (2 CC Reps)
 Devonshire Guild (4 CC Reps)
 Doncaster and District Society
 Dordrecht Ringers Guild
 Dorset County Association (2 CC Reps)
 Durham and Newcastle Diocesan Association (4 CC Reps)
 Durham University Society (1 CC Rep)
 East Anglia University
 East Derbyshire & West Nottinghamshire Association (1 CC Reps)
 East Grinstead and District Guild (1 CC Reps)
 Edinburgh University Guild
 Ely Diocesan Association (4 CC Reps)
 Essex Association (5 CC Reps)
 Exeter University Change Ringing
 Faraday Guild
 Fire Service Guild
 Four Shires Guild (2 CC Reps)
 Framland Ringers Society
 Friends of Dorothy Society
 Geldrop, Guild of St Brigida Bellringers
 Gloucester and Bristol Diocesan Association (5 CC Reps)
 Guildford Diocesan Guild (4 CC Reps)
 Guild of Medical Ringers
Guild of St Magnus
 Halifax Archdeaconry Guild
 Handbell Ringers of Great Britain
 Hereford Diocesan Guild (4 CC Reps)
 Hertford County Association (4 CC Reps)
 Huddersfield University Society
 Hull University Society
 Irish Association (2 CC Reps)
 Keele University Society
 Kent County Association (5 CC Reps)
 Ladies' Guild (3 CC Reps)
 Lancashire Association (5 CC Reps)
 Lancaster University Society
 Leeds University Society (1 CC Reps)
 Leicester Diocesan Guild (4 CC Reps)
 Leicester University Society
 Lichfield & Walsall Archdeaconry Society (3 CC Reps)
 Lincoln Diocesan Guild (4 CC Reps)
 Lincoln University Ringing
 Liverpool Universities Society (1 CC Reps)
 Llandaff and Monmouth Diocesan Association (3 CC Reps)
 Lundy Island Society of Change Ringers
 Manchester Universities Guild of Change Ringers
 Medway Universities
 Middlesex County Association & London Diocesan Guild (4 CC Reps)
 MIT Guild
 Musicians' Guild of Change Ringers
 National Police Guild (1 CC Rep)
 Newcastle Universities Society
 North American Guild of Change Ringers (4 CC Reps)
 North Staffordshire Association (3 CC Reps)
 North Wales Association (2 CC Reps)
 Norwich Diocesan Association (4 CC Reps)
 Nottingham University Society of Change Ringers
 Open University Society
 Oxford Diocesan Guild of Church Bell Ringers(6 CC Reps)
 Oxford Society of Change Ringers(1 CC Reps)
 Oxford University Society of Change Ringers (1 CC Rep)
 Peterborough Diocesan Guild (4 CC Reps)
 Portsmouth University
 Post and Telecom Ringers Guild
 Rambling Ringers Society
 Reading University
 Royal Air Force Guild
 Royal Naval Guild of Bellringers
 Saffron Walden Society
 Salisbury Diocesan Guild (5 CC Reps)
 Scottish Association (2 CC Reps)
 Sheffield Universities' Guild
 Shropshire Association (2 CC Reps)
 Society of Cambridge Youths
 Society of Royal Cumberland Youths (3 CC Reps)
 Society of Sherwood Youths (1 CC Reps)
 South African Guild (1 CC Reps)
 South Northamptonshire Society
 Southampton City Ringers
 Southampton University Guild of Change Ringers
 Southwell and Nottingham Diocesan Guild (4 CC Reps)
 St Agatha's Guild (1 CC Reps)
 St Andrews University
 St Brannock's Society of North Devon
 St David's Diocesan Guild (1 CC Reps)
 St James's Society
 St Martin's Guild for the Diocese of Birmingham (2 CC Reps)
 St Mary Abbotts Guild, Kensington
 Suffolk Guild of Ringers (4 CC Reps)
 Surrey Association (4 CC Reps)
 Surrey University Society
 Sussex County Association (5 CC Reps)
 Swansea and Brecon Diocesan Guild (2 CC Reps)
 Teachers, National Guild of
 Three and Four Bell National Society
 Towcester, St Lawrence Society
 Truro Diocesan Guild (5 CC Reps)
 University of Bristol Society of Change Ringers (2 CC Reps)
 University of London Society of Change Ringers (1 CC Reps)
 Veronese, Associazione Suonatori di Campane a Sistema (2 CC Reps)
 Wells Amateur Bellringing Society
 Welsh Colleges Guild
 West Anglia Society
 Whiting Society
 Winchester and Portsmouth Diocesan Guild (5 CC Reps)
 Worcestershire and Districts Association (4 CC Reps)
 York Colleges Guild
 Yorkshire Association (5 CC Reps)

List of carillon organizations
 The Guild of Carillonneurs in North America
 Royal Carillon School "Jef Denyn"

List of handbell organizations
 Bells at Temple Square
 Dorothy Shaw Bell Choir
 Pikes Peak Ringers
 The Raleigh Ringers

References

 
Campanology
Bell ringing organizations